Wayne Wightman is an American science fiction writer.  His short stories have been published in magazines such as Fantasy & Science Fiction, Thirteenth Moon, and Pulphouse.  They have been featured in the anthologies Future on Fire, The Best from Fantasy & Science Fiction: A 40th Anniversary Anthology, and Imperial Stars, vol 2.

His short story collection, Ganglion, was published in 1995 by Tachyon Publications.

He received a BA and MA degree from San Francisco State University.

He currently teaches creative writing at Modesto Junior College in Modesto, California.

References

External links 
 

Year of birth missing (living people)
Living people
American science fiction writers
American short story writers
San Francisco State University alumni
American male novelists
American male short story writers